The 1986 Rous Cup was the second staging of the Rous Cup international football competition, centred on the then-traditional annual game between rivals England and Scotland.

The cup was won by England, who defeated the previous year's winners Scotland 2–1. This was the final time in which the cup would only be contested by the two nations; from 1987 onward, a third team was also invited to participate.

Match details

References

Rous Cup
1985–86 in English football
1985–86 in Scottish football
International association football competitions hosted by England
Rous Cup
Scotland national football team matches
England national football team matches
England–Scotland football rivalry
Events at Wembley Stadium
April 1986 sports events in the United Kingdom